Above Diamond, also known by the abbreviation AD,  is a giant sequoia located within the Atwell Mill Grove of Sequoia National Park, California. Naturalists Dennis Coggins, Wendell D. Flint, and Michael M. Law named the tree "Above Diamond" after Diamond, a giant sequoia located just downhill from the tree. It is the second largest tree in Atwell Mill Grove, the 24th largest giant sequoia in the world, and could be considered the 23rd largest depending on how badly Ishi Giant atrophied during the Rough Fire in 2015.

Description

Dimensions

See also
List of largest giant sequoias
List of individual trees

References

Individual giant sequoia trees
Sequoia National Park